Miss Decibel is a 1978 studio album from Swedish "dansband" Wizex. The album contained the song "Miss Decibel", which was listed on Svensktoppen, along with the song "Om en stund". The album reached number two on the Swedish Albums Chart.

Track listing

Side A

Side B

Contributing
Kikki Danielsson - vocals
Tommy Stjernfeldt - vocals, guitar
Lars Hagelin - vocals, piano, synthesizer
Mats Nilsson - bass guitar
Thommy Carlsson - song, guitar, saxophone
Jerker Nilsson - drums

Charts

References

1978 albums
Wizex albums